Argonium (also called the argon hydride cation, the hydridoargon(1+) ion, or protonated argon; chemical formula ArH+) is a cation combining a proton and an argon atom. It can be made in an electric discharge, and was the first noble gas molecular ion to be found in interstellar space.

Properties
Argonium is isoelectronic with hydrogen chloride. Its dipole moment is 2.18 D for the ground state. The binding energy is 369 kJ mol−1 (2.9 eV).

Rotationless radiative lifetimes of different vibrational states vary with isotope and become shorter for the more rapid high-energy vibrations:
{|class="wikitable"
|+Lifetimes (ms)
!v !!ArH+ !!ArD+
|-
|1 ||2.28 ||9.09
|-
|2 ||1.20 ||4.71
|-
|3 ||0.85 ||3.27
|-
|4 ||0.64 ||2.55
|-
|5 ||0.46 ||2.11
|}

The force constant in the bond is calculated at 3.88 mdyne/Å2.

Reactions
ArH+ + H2 → Ar + 
ArH+ + C  → Ar + CH+
ArH+ + N  → Ar + NH+
ArH+ + O  → Ar + OH+
ArH+ + CO  → Ar + COH+

But the reverse reaction happens:

Ar +  → ArH+ + H.
Ar +  → *ArH+ + H2

Ar+ + H2 has a cross section of 10−18 m2 for low energy. It has a steep drop off for energies over 100 eV

Over 4 eV more Ar+ and H starts to appear.

Argonium is also produced from Ar+ ions produced by cosmic rays and X-rays from neutral argon.

Ar+ + H2 → *ArH+ + H 1.49 eV

When ArH+ encounters an electron, dissociative recombination can occur, but it is extremely slow for lower energy electrons, allowing ArH+ to survive for a much longer time than many other similar protonated cations.

ArH+ + e−  → Ar + H

Because ionisation potential of argon atoms is lower than that of the hydrogen molecule (in contrast to that of helium or neon), the argon ion reacts with molecular hydrogen, but for helium and neon ions, they will strip an electron from a hydrogen molecule.

Ar+ + H2 → ArH+ + H
Ne+ + H2 → Ne + H+ + H (dissociative charge transfer)
He+ + H2 → He + H+ + H

Spectrum
Artificial ArH+ made from earthly argon contains mostly the isotope 40Ar rather than the cosmically abundant 36Ar. Artificially it is made by an electric discharge through an argon–hydrogen mixture. Brault and Davis were the first to detect the molecule using infrared spectroscopy to observe vibration–rotation bands. 

The UV spectrum has two absorption points resulting in the ion breaking up. The 11.2 eV conversion to the B1Π state has a low dipole and so does not absorb much. A 15.8 eV to a repulsive A1Σ+ state is at a shorter wavelength than the Lyman limit, and so there are very few photons around to do this in space.

Natural occurrence
ArH+ occurs in interstellar diffuse atomic hydrogen gas. For argonium to form, the fraction of molecular hydrogen H2 must be in the range 0.0001 to 0.001.  Different molecular ions form in correlation with different concentrations of H2. Argonium is detected by its absorption lines at 617.525 GHz (J = 1→0), and 1234.602 GHz (J = 2→1). These lines are due to the isotopolog 36Ar1H+ undergoing rotational transitions. The lines have been detected in the direction of the galactic centre SgrB2(M) and SgrB2(N), G34.26+0.15, W31C (G10.62−0.39), W49(N), and W51e, however where absorption lines are observed, argonium is not likely to be in the microwave source, but instead in the gas in front of it. Emission lines are found in the Crab Nebula.

In the Crab Nebula ArH+ occurs in several spots revealed by emission lines. The strongest place is in the Southern Filament. This is also the place with the strongest concentration of Ar+ and Ar2+ ions. The column density of ArH+ in the Crab Nebula is between 1012 and 1013 atoms per square centimeter. Possible the energy required to excite the ions so that then can emit comes from collisions with electrons or hydrogen molecules.

Two isotopologs of argonium 36ArH+ and 38ArH+ are known to be in a distant unnamed galaxy with z = 0.88582 (7.5 billion light years away) which is on the line of sight to the blazar PKS 1830−211.

Electron neutralization and destruction of argonium outcompletes the formation rate in space if the H2 concentration is below 1 in 10−4.

History
Using the McMath solar Fourier transform spectrometer at Kitt Peak National Observatory, James W. Brault and Sumner P. Davis observed ArH+ vibration-rotation infrared lines for the first time. J. W. C. Johns also observed the infrared spectrum.

Use
Argon facilitates the reaction of tritium (T2) with double bonds in fatty acids by forming an ArT+ (tritium argonium) intermediate. When gold is sputtered with an argon-hydrogen plasma, the actual displacement of gold is done by ArH+.

References

Argon compounds